

The AGA Aviation LRG was a proposed amphibious transport glider design for the US Navy during World War II.

Development
The LRG was a design for a twin-hull amphibious glider capable of carrying 24 troops (12 in each hull). Two prototypes along with a static test airframe were ordered on 23 December 1941, and a 40% scale model glider with a civil registration was built to validate the aerodynamic behavior of the LRG. However, development of the LRG and production as the Naval Air Factory LR2N was cancelled in 1943 without either the prototypes or static test airframe ever being built.

Specification (AGA LRG / NAF LR2N)

See also

References

Further reading
 

LRG
1940s United States military transport aircraft
1940s United States military gliders
Low-wing aircraft
Cancelled military aircraft projects of the United States